The Morris Institute Dairy Barn was a historic barn in rural White County, Arkansas.  It was located on the campus of the Morris Institute, northwest of Searcy off Arkansas Highway 320.  It was a two-story wood-frame structure, with a gable roof that was extended over a single-story extension on one side.  Its internal arrangement was unusual, with a central drive that was intersected at one point by another drive extending into the shed section.  Built about 1930, it was the county's best example of a Depression-era dairy barn.

The barn was listed on the National Register of Historic Places in 1992.  It has been listed as destroyed in the Arkansas Historic Preservation Program database.

See also
National Register of Historic Places listings in White County, Arkansas

References

Barns on the National Register of Historic Places in Arkansas
Demolished buildings and structures in Arkansas
National Register of Historic Places in White County, Arkansas
1930 establishments in Arkansas
Buildings and structures completed in 1930
Dairy buildings in the United States